Whitcomb Cobblestone Farmhouse is a historic home located at Mendon in Monroe County, New York. It is a vernacular Greek Revival style cobblestone farmhouse built about 1847. It is constructed of medium-sized field cobbles and is one of only 10 surviving cobblestone buildings in Mendon.

It was listed on the National Register of Historic Places in 1996.

References

Houses on the National Register of Historic Places in New York (state)
Cobblestone architecture
Greek Revival houses in New York (state)
Houses completed in 1847
Houses in Monroe County, New York
1847 establishments in New York (state)
National Register of Historic Places in Monroe County, New York